Liam Jack Hurt (born 15 March 1994) is an English first class cricketer. He made his List A debut for Leicestershire in the 2015 Royal London One-Day Cup on 6 August 2015. He made his Twenty20 debut on 26 August 2019, for Lancashire in the 2019 t20 Blast. Hurt made his first class County Championship Division 2 debut against former club Leicestershire on 23 September 2019. On 17 September 2022, Hurt played in the 2022 Royal London One-Day Cup against Kent County Cricket Club at Trent Bridge. On 21 November 2022, Staffordshire County Cricket Club announced the signing of Hurt following his release from Lancashire at the end of the 2022 season.

References

External links
 

1994 births
Living people
Cricketers from Preston, Lancashire
English cricketers
Lancashire cricketers